Vidalasia is a genus of flowering plants in the family Rubiaceae. The genus is found in Malaysia, Thailand, Vietnam, and the Philippines.

Species
Vidalasia fusca 
Vidalasia morindifolia 
Vidalasia murina 
Vidalasia pubescens 
Vidalasia tonkinensis

References

Rubiaceae genera
Gardenieae